Demons! is a themed anthology of fantasy short works edited by American writers Jack Dann and Gardner Dozois. It was first published in paperback by Ace Books in July 1987. It was reissued as an ebook by Baen Books in March 2013.

The book collects fourteen novelettes and short stories by various science fiction authors, together with a bibliography of further reading by the editors.

Contents
"Grail" (Harlan Ellison)
"The Willow Platform" (Joseph Payne Brennan)
"The Night of White Bhairab" (Lucius Shepard)
"The Mangler" (Stephen King)
"The Last Demon" (Isaac Bashevis Singer)
"The Golden Rope" (Tanith Lee)
"Basileus" (Robert Silverberg)
"Twilla" (Tom Reamy)
"The Purple Pterodactyls" (L. Sprague de Camp)
"Goslin Day" (Avram Davidson)
"Nellthu" (Anthony Boucher)
"Snulbug" (Anthony Boucher)
"One Other" (Manly Wade Wellman)
"An Ornament to His Profession" (Charles L. Harness)
"Further Reading" (Gardner Dozois and Jack Dann)

References

1987 anthologies
Fantasy anthologies
Jack Dann and Gardner Dozois Ace anthologies
Ace Books books